Dayana Sabrina Mendoza Moncada (born 1 June 1986) is a Venezuelan actress, model, film producer and director. She is also a former beauty queen, winner of the titles of Miss Venezuela 2007 and Miss Universe 2008.

Dayana Mendoza, in 2012, participated in Celebrity Apprentice, with magnate Donald Trump.

In 2018, she ventured as a producer and director of films.

Personal life
Dayana Mendoza, was born in Caracas and her parents are Willy Mendoza and Laura Moncada from the states of Táchira and Aragua (Venezuela).

Mendoza was once kidnapped in Venezuela, and stated that its psychological trauma taught her to remain poised under pressure. In 2001, she signed with Elite Model Management after being Top 15 semifinalist at the Elite Model Look International 2001 held in Nice, France. She has worked with the companies Max Mara and Costume National, where she modeled in New York City, Italy, Germany, France, Greece, and Spain for Versace, Roberto Cavalli and other fashion designers over eight years. She speaks Spanish, English, and Italian fluently.

After Elite, she signed with the Trump Model Management since 2009, and in Milan with Names Model Agency.

In 2012, she denied the rumors, that she had an affair with magnate Donald Trump.

Dayana married businessman; Michael Pagano, on 6 December 2013. The wedding was celebrated in Altos de Chavón in the Dominican Republic.  The celebration lasted three days. The former Miss Universe wore an outfit designed by the Venezuelan fashion designer Ángel Sánchez.

Subsequently, on 7 June 2015, Mendoza announced on her Instagram account that she was pregnant and expecting a daughter.

On 5 October 2015, she gave birth to Eva Mendoza Pagano in New York.

In September 2016, Mendoza separated from Michael Pagano officially, declaring in an interview that the separation was carried out on good terms.

In August 2020, she was baptized under the evangelical Christian religion.

Pageantry

Miss Venezuela 2007

Mendoza beat out 27 other candidates to win Miss Venezuela 2007 on 13 September 2007, and became only the second woman representing the Amazonas state to win, following Carolina Izsak in 1991.

Miss Universe 2008

She was crowned Miss Universe 2008 at the pageant at the Crown Convention Center, Nha Trang, Vietnam, on 13 July 2008. Mendoza became the first winner of the pageant from Venezuela since Miss Universe 1996's winner Alicia Machado. 

Miss Universe 2007 Riyo Mori crowned her with a tiara worth . Her prize package includes cash, a year contract promoting Miss Universe, world travel, a rent-free prestigious New York City apartment, a luxury apartment, and a gift bag stuffed with designer shoes, dresses and beauty products, a  stipend for a two-year course at the New York Film Academy and free access to famous fashion houses and beauty parlors. Mendoza will spend her year-long reign traveling the world to lecture on humanitarian issues and to promote education regarding HIV/AIDS.

As of June 2009, Mendoza as Miss Universe has traveled to Indonesia, Singapore, Spain, France, Nicaragua, Ukraine, Czech Republic, Bahamas, Russia, El Salvador, the United Arab Emirates, Brazil, the Dominican Republic, Puerto Rico, Bolivia, Argentina, Romania, and Vietnam, in addition to numerous trips around the United States and her homecoming in Venezuela.

On August 23, 2009, Mendoza crowned her successor Stefanía Fernández (also from Venezuela) at the Imperial Ballroom in Nassau, The Bahamas.

Modeling photos
After photos of Mendoza modeling naked for a jewelry firm surfaced, officials from the Miss Universe Organization decided not to penalize her, saying that the candid photos were not pornographic but "artistic in nature, and they don't have an ounce of pornographic content to them."

Guantánamo Bay visit
On 27 March 2009, Mendoza documented a visit to the Guantanamo Bay detention camp on her Internet blog. In it, she was quoted as saying, "[Guantanamo] was such a relaxing place, so calm and beautiful". She also stated that when she visited the detainees camps, "...we saw the jails, where they shower, how they entertain themselves with movies, art classes, books. It was very interesting." In her home country, Venezuela, the issue became the talk of the town, with the president, Hugo Chávez, reconsidering the praise he had previously given her. The Miss Universe Organization has replied that "...[her] comments on her blog were in reference to the hospitality she received while meeting the members of the U.S. Military and their families who are stationed in Guantánamo". On 1 April 2009, the entry vanished from her blog.

Artistic career
Dayana Mendoza studied acting and cinema at New York Film Academy, one of the most important film institutes in the United States, thanks to a scholarship awarded by the Miss Universe Organization.

In 2009, she starred in her first short film Sweet Misery. In that year, she was part of the group of presenters of the morning show Venevisión, Portadas.
In 2010, she hosted Relaxed, a celebrity talk show broadcast on E! Entertainment, Latin America. That same year, she appeared in the music video "Bla Bla Bla". and accompanied Donald Trump to the island of Puerto Rico, where she recorded a golf program featuring the billionaire.

Also in 2010, Dayana is part of the cast of the comedy Lord of the Dreams.

Dayana participated in the famous reality show The Celebrity Apprentice with businessman Donald Trump, where she interacted with personalities such as Lisa Lampanelli, George Takei, Clay Aiken and Debbie Gibson. Dayana's participation in the TV program was involved in controversy, due to the alleged rivalry she had with the American comedian Lisa Lampanelli. Mendoza finished 6th place. 

In 2013, she played Jasmine in the short film, The Mermaid Complex.

In 2017, she starred in the movie Nothing's Fair in Love, where she played Jessica.

In 2018, she produced her first film titled Honey, which received good reviews. Honey was recognized as a semi-finalist film by the Hollywood International Film Festival.

In 2019, she participated as the host of the Queen Beauty Universe.

Other appearances 
Together with Miss Universe 1969 Gloria Diaz, Mendoza was the goodwill ambassador of Venezuela-based technology firm Smartmatic to thank the Philippines for entrusting the company the success of their 2010 presidential elections.

On June 3, 2012, Mendoza served as one of the panel of judges for the Miss USA 2012 competition.

In March 2015, she appears in a commercial for a drink, along with Miss Universe 2012; Olivia Culpo of the United States and Miss Universe 2014; Paulina Vega from Colombia.  The filming took place on the island of Bali in Indonesia.

On January 6, 2018, Mendoza returned to the Crown Convention Center in Nha Trang, Vietnam, where she was crowned Miss Universe 2008, as a judge on Miss Universe Vietnam 2017.

Filmography
2009: Sweet Misery (Short film.Natas Productions) ....... Protagonist.
2009: Portada's (Programa.Venevision) ........ presenter
2010: Lord of the Dreams (Short Film) ......... Supporting Actress (Isabela).
2010: Relaxed (Show interview.E! (Latin America)) ...... Hostess.
2010: Bla Bla Bla (Music Video) ......... Protagonist.
2012: Celebrity Apprentice (Reality Show, NBC) ... Participant.
2013: The Mermaid Complex ......... (Short Film) ........ Supporting Actress (Jasmine).
2017: Nothing's Fair in Love (short film, 1 More Mile Productions) .......... Protagonist (Jessica).
2018: Honey (Short film,Dayana Mendoza Productions in association with Jane Chae) ......... Executive producer and director
2019: Queen Beauty Universe 2019 .......... Presenter

See also

 Stefanía Fernández
 Hannelly Quintero
 Dayana Colmenares
 Gabriela Isler

References

External links

 Miss Universe Official website
 Miss Venezuela Official website 

1986 births
Kidnapped Venezuelan people
Kidnappings in Venezuela
Living people
Miss Universe 2008 contestants
Miss Universe winners
Miss Venezuela winners
New York Film Academy alumni
People from Caracas
Participants in American reality television series
The Apprentice (franchise) contestants
Venezuelan beauty pageant winners
Venezuelan female models
Television controversies in Venezuela
Venezuelan bloggers
Venezuelan women bloggers